Trovaoconus is a synonym of Conus (Kalloconus) da Motta, 1991 represented as Conus Linnaeus, 1758. It consists of sea snails, marine gastropod mollusks in the family Conidae, the cone snails and their allies.

Species
 Trovaoconus ateralbus (Kiener, 1845) represented as Conus ateralbus Kiener, 1845 (alternate representation)
 Trovaoconus atlanticoselvagem (Afonso & Tenorio, 2004) represented as Conus atlanticoselvagem Afonso & Tenorio, 2004 (alternate representation)
 Trovaoconus pseudonivifer (Monteiro, Tenorio & Poppe, 2004) represented as Conus pseudonivifer Monteiro, Tenorio & Poppe, 2004 (alternate representation)
 Trovaoconus trochulus (Reeve, 1844) represented as Conus trochulus Reeve, 1844 (alternate representation)
 Trovaoconus venulatus (Hwass in Bruguière, 1792) represented as Conus venulatus Hwass in Bruguière, 1792 (alternate representation)

References

External links
 To World Register of Marine Species

Conidae